2-methylisoborneol synthase (EC 4.2.3.118, sco7700, 2-MIB cyclase, MIB synthase, MIBS) is an enzyme with systematic name (E)-2-methylgeranyl-diphosphate diphosphate-lyase (cyclizing, 2-methylisoborneol-forming). This enzyme catalyses the following chemical reaction

 (E)-2-methylgeranyl diphosphate + H2O  2-methylisoborneol + diphosphate

The product, 2-methylisoborneol, is a characteristic odiferous compound with a musty smell produced by soil microorganisms.

References

External links 
 

EC 4.2.3